Eramam is a village in Kannur district in Indian state of Kerala.

Demographics
As of 2011 Census, Eramam had a population of 9,448 with 4,478 males and 4,970 females. Population in the age group 0-6 was 931 (9.8%) which constitutes 484 males and 447 females. Eramam had overall literacy of 92.5% where male literacy stands at 97.1% and female literacy was 88.5%.

Transportation
The national highway passes through Perumba junction. Goa and Mumbai can be accessed on the northern side and Cochin and Thiruvananthapuram can be accessed on the southern side.  The road to the east of Iritty connects to Mysore and Bangalore.  The nearest railway station is Payyanur on Mangalore-Palakkad line. 
Trains are available to almost all parts of India subject to advance booking over the internet.  There are airports at Mattanur, Mangalore and Calicut. All of them are international airports but direct flights are available only to Middle Eastern countries.

See also
 Mathamangalam
 Kadannappally
 Vellora
 Olayampadi
 Pilathara
 Pariyaram

References

Villages near Payyanur